Blue Mountain is a peak in the Adirondack Mountains of New York State in the United States. It is the location of the Blue Mountain Fire Observation Station, listed on the National Register of Historic Places in 2001.

History

In September 1911, the Civilian Conservation Corps (CCC) built a  wooden tower. In 1917, the CCC replaced the wooden tower with a  Aermotor LS40 tower. During the Cold War the threat of nuclear annihilation was a serious concern. One of these stations was built on Blue Mountain and became operational in January 1959 and was decommissioned in December 1967. The fire tower ceased fire lookout operations in 1990, and was one of the last operating fire towers in New York State. It was one of the longest operating towers in New York, second only to the St. Regis Mountain fire tower. In 1992, the fire tower and cabin were seriously vandalized by unknown individuals. The incident occurred around the same time that Pharaoh Mountain tower was toppled, and some believe it may have been done by the same people. The tower was added to the National Register of Historic Places in 2001. The FFLA, Team Rubicon, and New York State Department of Environmental Conservation did significant restoration work on the tower in 2019.

References

External links

The Fire Towers of New York

Adirondacks
Mountains of Hamilton County, New York
Tourist attractions in Hamilton County, New York
Mountains of New York (state)